The 1973 season of Japanese  football.

League tables

JSL First Division
Tanabe Pharmaceuticals was relegated, thereby becoming the first Japanese team to go straight back down one season after promotion.

JSL 1/2 promotion/relegation Series

Eidai promoted, Tanabe relegated.

JSL Second Division

JSL promotion/relegation Series
Sumitomo, at the time based in Osaka, would move to Kashima, Ibaraki in 1975 and become today's Kashima Antlers.

Hitachi Ibaraki and Sumitomo promoted, Toyota Industries and Hagoromo Club relegated.

References

1973
1
Jap
Jap